The 2017 Canadian American Association of Professional Baseball season began on May 18, 2017, and ended on September 4, 2017. Following the regular season, the playoffs were held. It was the league's 13th season of operations. The Quebec Capitales defeated the Rockland Boulders in the championship round to capture their seventh championship. To date, the Capitales have the most championships out of any team in the Can-Am League.

Season summary

This season saw the tours of the Cuban and Dominican Republic National traveling teams. The Cuban team played 21 games, finishing 5-16, while the Dominican Republic team played 17 games, finishing 2-15.

All Star Game 

The 2017 Can-Am League All Star Game took place on July 25, 2017, at Raymond Chabot Grant Thornton Park, home of the Ottawa Champions. There, the Can-Am League All Stars played against the American Association of Independent Professional Baseball All-Stars. The final score was the Can-Am League All Stars 3, the American Association of Independent Professional Baseball All-Stars 2.

Standings 

* Teams not eligible for playoffs

Playoffs

Bracket

Semifinals

Quebec vs. Sussex County

Rockland vs. New Jersey

Championship

Quebec vs. Rockland

Attendance

References

External links
Can-Am League website

Canadian American Association of Professional Baseball
Canam
Canam
Canam